Mogens Christensen (9 December 1929 – 25 July 2020) was a Norwegian luger. He was born in Oslo. He participated at the 1964 Winter Olympics in Innsbruck, where he placed 14th in singles. He was Norwegian champion in single in 1963.

References

External links

1929 births
2020 deaths
Sportspeople from Oslo
Norwegian male lugers
Olympic lugers of Norway
Lugers at the 1964 Winter Olympics